is a suburban, residential area of Tokyo in Suginami ward, approximately 8 km west of Shinjuku. Ogikubo has the Ogikubo Station on the JR Chūō Line (Rapid), the JR Chūō-Sōbu Line, the Tokyo Metro Marunouchi Line (terminus) and the Tokyo Metro Tōzai Line extension (which runs on the Chūō-Sōbu Line tracks). The Japanese headquarters of American Express is located near the station.

The area's main shopping area mostly consists of three connected department stores; Seiyu, Town Seven and Lumine. Seiyu is a low-price department store owned by Wal-Mart Stores, Inc. selling food, clothes, home goods, etc. There are also various types of stores and restaurants in the area surrounding the train station.

Ogikubo is commonly referred to as the birthplace of Tokyo ramen. More specifically, Ogikubo ramen is known for ramen cooked with fish bones instead of pork bones. Exiting from the North side of the station (Kitaguchi) and heading towards the Amanuma neighborhood one comes across many of the famous Ogikubo-ramen-tens. This is to the northwest of Ogikubo and Ogikubo Station.

 is the name of a kind of reed in Japanese, and  means "hollow".

References

Districts of Suginami